Selección Jalisco was a former Mexican football team that played in the Liga Mexicana de Football Amateur Association prior to the professionalization and development of the México Primera División. Prior to the invitation to the Primera Fuerza the team played exhibition games formed with players with various Jalisco teams from the Liga Occidental De Jalisco.

History
The first squad, formed by players from  Guadalajara, Atlas, Nacional, and Oro, was organized in 1926

The team traveled around Mexico playing exhibition games against local teams. The most famous matches were against team from Mexico City where they played in 1926, 1928, and 1930. The matches were against teams from Primera Fuerza of the Mexico City. These teams were Marte, Club España, Asturias, and América.

Although the matches were even, the Jaliscience teams were greatly affected by the capital teams. The capital teams saw the potential of the players and began to give offers to bring them to play for them. Marte would end up staying with half of the Selección Jalisco after General Aguirre offered large sums in order to get the players on loans.

"La Venada" Alatorre, Ignacio "El Calavera" Ávila, Tomás "El Poeta" Lozano, Lorenzo "La Yegua" Camarena, "El Patarato" Hernández y "El Moco" Hilario López, were some of the players that played in the first team in 1926.

After some time, the team influenced the Liga de Jalisco by giving it a huge boost by helping expand football over the whole state of Jalisco.

José Pelón Gutiérrez, Fausto Prieto, Max Prieto, Reyes "Terile" Sánchez, Luis Reyes, Teofilo Tilo García, Victoriano Zarco Vázquez, Pablo "Pablotas" González, Manuel "Cosas" López and Wintilio Lozano, were some of the players that formed the second squad in 1928.

In 1937, the squad became the first team from Mexico to travel on a tour. This tour took place in Colombia where they played against teams from Argentina, Panama, Colombia, Ecuador, Cuba, Venezuela, and Peru.

Primera Fuerza

1940–41
The rise of football in Jalisco motivated Liga Mayor to invite Selección Jalisco to participate in the Primera Fuerza. The first game took place on 11 August 1940 at Campo Oro de Oblatos against Moctezuma. The final score was 5–1 in favor of Selección Jalisco. Their starting line-up was:

Goalkeeper: Fausto Quirarte y Angel Torres "Ranchero".
Defense: Antonio Casillas, José Gutiérrez "Pelón", José Luis Navarro.
Midfielders: "Térile" Reyes Sánchez, "Nano" Hernández, Rodrigo Ruiz, "Pis" Salcido, Gustavo González.
Forwards: "Tilo" Teófilo García, Fausto Prieto, "Pirracas" José Castellanos, "Pablotas" Pablo González, Max Prieto, "Cazuelas" Luis Grajeda, Luis Reyes, José Guadalupe Velázquez.

The team was very successful in attendance as well. In the season after the first seven games the team was in first place in the standings one point ahead of Atlante. They had only lose three points, a 0–0 draw against Asturias in Guadalajara and 2–5 defeat against Atlante in parque Asturias. They had 23 goals in favor in this time frame. However, during the last seven games it was a different story. The condition of the team plummeted and was only able to gain four points out of twelfth placing them in 5th place at the end of the season.

Selección Jalisco ended participating in the 1940–41, 1941–42, and 1942–43 seasons where their performance left them in mid table. During those seasons the team was composed of notable players such as Villavicencio, "El Pelón" Gutiérrez, "Pirracas" Castellanos, Rodrigo Ruiz, "Tilo" García, Max Prieto, Luis Reyes, "El Cosas" López, "El Ranchero" Torres, Lupe Velázquez, Pablo "Pablotas" Gonzalez, "El Zarco" Vazquez, and Bonfiglio who was the goalkeeper and head coach.

1943–44
In 1943, the Liga Mayor de Jalisco, Liga Veracruzana, and Liga Mayor del Distrito Federal joined together in order to form the first professional division of Mexico, Primera División. Due to this the team gave way to Guadalajara, Atlas, and Oro to participate in the newly formed league.

Future appearances
Since Jalisco had teams in the professional league it moved aside from having a squad. However, the squad was reunited once in a while in order to play exhibition games. In 1981 Selección Jalisco defeated Barcelona 1–0 on 13 May.

Selección Jalisco: Ledesma, Chávez, Zapiain, Cisneros, Barba, Aurélio, Real, Guillen, Magaña, Rangel, Bernardino, Subs: Cárdenas, Hugo-Díaz,
Márquez.
Barcelona: Artola, Ramos, Migueli, Olmo, Manolo, Sánchez, Landáburu, (Albaladejo), Paco-Martínez, Estella, Simonsen, (Carrasco), Ramírez.
Referee: Joaquin Urrea.

Coaches
These were some of the coaches Selección Jalisco had during the period in Primera Fuerza from 1940–43:

Filberto Aceves
Ignacio "Calavera" Ávila
Loranzo "Yegua" Camarena
Antonio "Indio" Carrazco

Honours
 VIII Campeonato Nacional: 1941
Against Selección del Distrito Federal 3–2, 18 May 1941 in Mexico City
 Trofeo Manuel Ávila Camacho: 1941
Against Necaxa 2–0, 3 December 1941

See also
Football in Mexico

References

Defunct football clubs in Jalisco
Defunct football clubs in Mexico
Association football clubs established in 1902
Association football clubs disestablished in 1912
1902 establishments in Mexico
1912 disestablishments in Mexico
Primera Fuerza teams